Shahrud (also Romanized as Shāhrūd and Shahrood; also known as Shāhrūd-e Fāreghān) is a village in Fareghan Rural District, Fareghan District, Hajjiabad County, Hormozgan Province, Iran. At the 2006 census, its population was 494, in 105 families.

References 

Populated places in Hajjiabad County